Sweet Love, Bitter is a 1967 film based on the novel Night Song by John Alfred Williams. The story is inspired by the life of jazz musician Charlie Parker. American jazz pianist Mal Waldron recorded a soundtrack album for the film.

Plot
The film opens with Richie "Eagle" Stokes (Dick Gregory) found dead in his bed before showing the journey of how he got there. He is a jazz musician, jaded by how society treats him and seeks to numb himself with drugs, liquor and women. He crosses paths with David Hillary (Don Murray), a white male and former professor, when they both find themselves at a pawn shop. Hillary is distraught by the loss of his wife in a car accident, convinced that he is the cause of her death. They bond over drinks only to be found by Keel Robinson (Robert Hooks), Stokes' friend and former reverend. Robinson offers to provide Hillary with a room in exchange for working at the coffee shop he owns.

Robinson and Hillary find Stokes at Candy's (Jeri Archer) house, over-dosed but not yet dead. From here the film further explores the relationship between Robinson his girlfriend Della(Diane Varsi) where they exhibit doubts and fears of interracial discrimination.

While waiting for Hillary to finish a job interview for a professor position, Stokes is accosted by a policeman. Hillary had seen the altercation from afar but had done nothing help him. When Stokes find out, he vents and seeks the company of Candy. Stokes passes away that night from a heroin overdose but Robinson says that his cause of death was, "resisting reality." Hillary and Robinson part their ways.

Cast
 Dick Gregory as Richie "Eagle" Stokes
 Robert Hooks as Keel Robinson
 Don Murray as David Hillary
 Diane Varsi as Della
 Jeri Archer as Candy
 Osborne Smith
 George Wilshire
 Bruce Glover
 Leonard Parker
 John Randolph
 Woody King Jr.
 Florette Carter
 Carla Pinza
 Barbara Davis as Girl In Bar

Production
Dick Gregory stated in his memoir that he had accepted the role to take his mind off of the passing of Malcolm X. Since the film was Gregory's first acting role, Woodie King Jr. was hired as his coach. Gregory had temporarily left the production to participate in the march on Selma.

Production Team
 Assistant Director: Ben Berk
 Cameraman: Morris Kellman
 Assistant Cameraman: Howard Neef
 Film Editor: Reva Schlesinger
 Sound Editor: Jack Fitzstephens
 Assistant Editor: Macel Wilson
 Sound Engineer: Jack Gofsky
 Sound Mixer: Albert Gramaglia
 Director's Assistant: Mike Kitei
 Sets: Kees Van Dyke
 Script Girl: Dolores Friedman
 Make-Up: Andrew McKay
 Still Photographer: Arnold Eagle
 Casting: Sam Chew Jr.
 Dick Gregory's Coach: Woodie King Jr,
 Additional Dialogue: Martin Kroll
 Hair-styling: Herbert's
 Clothes: Villager
 Recorded at: Recording Studios Inc.
 Film Processing: Pathe Laboratories
 Production Studio: Film Three Productions Inc.

Reception

The film debuted at Carnegie Hall on January 30, 1967. Mayor John Lindsay was in attendance because Dick Gregory had endorsed him in 1965.

The film was re-cut and shown at art houses under the title of Black Love--White Love as well as It Won't Rub Off, Baby!

References

External links
 
 
 

1967 films
African-American films
American black-and-white films
Films based on American novels
1967 directorial debut films
1960s English-language films